Stephen Michael Largent (born September 28, 1954) is an American former football wide receiver and politician who played in the National Football League (NFL) for 14 seasons with the Seattle Seahawks. A member of the Republican Party, he served in the U.S. House of Representatives for Oklahoma's 1st congressional district from 1994 to 2002. He was also the Republican nominee in the 2002 Oklahoma gubernatorial election.

Largent played college football at Tulsa University, where he studied biology, and began his NFL career with the expansion Seahawks in 1976. Regarded as one of the greatest wide receivers of all time, he held all major NFL receiving records at the time of his retirement. Largent was inducted to the Pro Football Hall of Fame in 1995.

Following his playing career, Largent was elected to the U.S. House of Representatives in 1994 and served four terms, winning over 60% of the vote in each election. He resigned from his seat in 2002 to run for governor of Oklahoma, which he narrowly lost to Democrat Brad Henry.

Football career

In 1974 at the University of Tulsa, Largent had 884 yards receiving and 14 touchdown catches. In 1975, he had 51 catches for 1,000 yards and 14 touchdown catches.

Despite an All-American career at Tulsa, Largent was not selected until the fourth round of the 1976 NFL Draft by the Houston Oilers (117th pick). After four preseason games, he was slated to be cut, but was instead traded to the expansion Seattle Seahawks for a 1977 eighth-round pick. According to Largent, Bum Phillips called him into his office and told Largent he had all the receivers they needed, and that Houston would be releasing him. Largent feared his career was over before it began.

Largent spent 14 years with the Seahawks, initially reuniting with his college offensive coordinator, Jerry Rhome. His first practice with the team went horribly, as he suffered from sleep deprivation for 9 days while financially struggling to care for his mother and three younger brothers after their mother left her alcoholic and violent second husband. While not particularly fast, Steve was extremely sure-handed and was able to get wide open due to his route-running discipline. He became the first Seahawk selected to the Pro Bowl in 1978, and was selected six more times during his career. In 1979 he led the league in receiving yards with 1,237, and six years later did it again with 1,287 in 1985. His 1985 receiving yardage was a Seahawks franchise record that stood for 35 years until broken by DK Metcalf in 2020.

In 1987, Largent ended his participation in the NFLPA strike after the third and final week of the strike. With the retirement of Charlie Joiner the previous year, Largent became the NFL's active leader in career receiving yards, retaining that lead until his retirement in 1989. He broke Joiner's all-time record for receiving yards (12,146) in Week 3 of 1988. In the same season, he suffered a concussion and lost two teeth when he was hit by Mike Harden of the Denver Broncos. Harden was tackled by Largent and lost a fumble 14 weeks later after Harden's initial interception.

In 1989, Largent became the first Seahawks player to win the Steve Largent Award for his spirit, dedication, and integrity.

During his playing career Largent was given the nickname “Yoda” for his ability to catch anything thrown at him. He attributes this ability from a skeet shooting buddy that focuses only on the edge of the skeet, as he only focuses on the tip of the ball to track and catch balls, in the era where receivers and defensive backs don't wear gloves. This also allowed him to quickly adjust from catching with left-handed Jim Zorn to right-handed Dave Krieg.

When Largent retired, he held all major NFL receiving records, including: most receptions in a career (819), most receiving yards in a career (13,089), and most touchdown receptions (100). He was also in possession of a then-record streak of 177 consecutive regular-season games with a reception. He also holds the distinction as the first receiver in NFL history to achieve 100 touchdown receptions in his career. Largent's record of 100 receiving touchdowns stood until 1992 when it was broken by Jerry Rice.

Largent was inducted into the Pro Football Hall of Fame in 1995, his first year of eligibility. In 1999, he was ranked number 46 on The Sporting News list of the 100 Greatest Football Players, the only Seahawk to make the list.

His #80 was retired in 1992; Largent is the first Seahawk player to be so honored. During Jerry Rice's stint with the Seahawks in 2004, Largent's #80 was temporarily "unretired" after a conversation between Rice (who idolized Largent growing up) and Largent that was reportedly initiated by then Seahawks president Bob Whitsitt. Largent remains the most prolific receiver in team history. On October 26, 2008, Largent's University of Tulsa #83 was also retired.

NFL career statistics

Political career

Tenure in Congress 
In 1994, Oklahoma's 1st District Congressman Jim Inhofe resigned to run in a special election to succeed Senator David Boren. Largent won the election to succeed Inhofe in Congress; pursuant to an Oklahoma statute, Governor David Walters designated the special election in which Largent was elected to serve the remainder of Inhofe's term in the 103rd Congress before beginning his term in the 104th Congress.

Largent took office on November 29, 1994, and was reelected to the three succeeding Congresses, never winning less than 60 percent of the vote in the heavily Republican Tulsa-based district.

Like many in the Republican freshman class elected in 1994, when the Republicans took control of the House for the first time in 40 years, Largent's voting record was solidly conservative. Largent was one of the "true believers" in that freshman class, devoting most of his time to issues important to conservative Christians.

One of his first bills was a "parental rights" bill that died in committee after it attracted opposition even from other Christian conservatives. Another of his bills would have abolished the federal tax code at the end of 2001. He opposed ending the 1995 federal government shutdown and played a role in the failed attempt to oust Newt Gingrich as Speaker. Largent introduced a bill that would ban adoptions by gay and lesbian parents in Washington, D. C.

He was accused of being anti-Catholic due to his line of questioning of a House of Representatives chaplain in 2000, though he denied this.

After the Republicans lost five seats in the 1998 midterm elections, Largent tried to take advantage of discontent with Majority Leader Dick Armey by challenging Armey for the post. Although Armey was not popular in the Republican caucus, Largent was thought to be far too conservative for the liking of some moderate Republicans, and Armey won on the third ballot.  However, when Bob Livingston of Louisiana stood down as Speaker-elect, Armey was still too wounded to make a bid for the job.

Run for governor 
Largent decided to run for governor of Oklahoma in 2002. He easily won the Republican nomination and resigned his House seat on February 15 to devote his energy to the race. Initially seen as an overwhelming favorite against Democratic state senator Brad Henry, Largent lost by just under 7,000 votes.

Largent's loss has been attributed by analysts to factors that included:
 The presence of a well-funded independent (Gary Richardson, a former Republican) on the general election ballot;
 Henry's support of cockfighting, garnering a last minute endorsement by rural cockfighting interests that turned out in large numbers in the election in which the legality of cockfighting was on the ballot;
 Largent used a vulgarity, "bullshit," in response to an Oklahoma City television reporter who repeatedly asked where he was at the time of the September 11, 2001 attacks. Largent had been on a hunting trip and did not know about the attacks until then.

Post-political career
Largent became president and CEO of CTIA-The Wireless Association in November 2003 and served until May 2014. CTIA is an international nonprofit membership organization founded in 1984, representing all sectors of wireless communications: cellular, personal communication services, and enhanced specialized mobile radio.

Personal life
In 1990, Largent received the Golden Plate Award of the American Academy of Achievement.

People magazine named Largent to its 1996 list of "Most Beautiful People".

Largent has a son Kramer James (b. November 11, 1985) with spina bifida. He and his wife, Terry, also had three older children, sons Kyle and Kelly and daughter Casie.

Electoral history

References

External links
 
 

 

|-

|-

|-

1954 births
Living people
20th-century American politicians
21st-century American politicians
American athlete-politicians
American Conference Pro Bowl players
American football wide receivers
Candidates in the 2002 United States elections
National Football League players with retired numbers
Players of American football from Oklahoma
Politicians from Tulsa, Oklahoma
Pro Football Hall of Fame inductees
Republican Party members of the United States House of Representatives from Oklahoma
Seattle Seahawks players
Sportspeople from Tulsa, Oklahoma
Tulsa Golden Hurricane football players
10,000 receiving yards club
Members of Congress who became lobbyists